Enrique Fava (1920 – 13 June 1994) was an Argentine actor. He appeared in 32 films and television shows between 1948 and 1986. He starred in the film Los dioses ajenos, which was entered into the 8th Berlin International Film Festival.

Selected filmography
 The Honourable Tenant (1951)
 Los Isleros (1951)
 El Vampiro negro (1953)
 Los dioses ajenos (1958)
 Sugar Harvest (1958)
 That Forward Center Died at Dawn (1961)
 The Innocents (1963)
 El Ayudante (1971)

References

External links

1920 births
1994 deaths
Argentine male film actors
20th-century Argentine male actors